Pierson Barton Reading (November 26, 1816 – May 29, 1868) (also referred to as Pearson, and as Parson) was a California pioneer.

Life
Reading was born in New Jersey. He came across country to California with Samuel J. Hensley as a member of the Chiles-Walker party in 1843. In 1844, Reading entered the service of General Sutter as a clerk, explorer, and chief of trappers. He received the  Mexican land grant Rancho Buena Ventura in 1844 for the area occupied by today's Redding, California, and Cottonwood, California, along the Sacramento River. In the Winter of 1844–45, while Sutter was marching with about one hundred men to join Governor Michaeltorena, Pierson was in command at Sutters Fort. In 1846, Reading was a participant in the Bear Flag Revolt. In the Mexican–American War, Reading enlisted under Fremont and was appointed Paymaster of the California Battalion, with the rank of Major. In 1848 Reading was among the first to visit James W. Marshall's gold discovery in Coloma, California – and shortly after engaged extensively in prospecting for gold in Shasta County, and along the Trinity River. In the fall of 1849, Major Reading fitted out an expedition to discover the bay into which he supposed the Trinity and Klamath Rivers must empty. From 1849 to 1850, Reading operated a store in Sacramento with Samuel J. Hensley and Jacob R. Snyder. He was the Whig candidate for Governor of California in 1851.

In 1854 Reading went to Washington, D.C. for the US Supreme Court hearing on his land grant claim. There he met and married Fanny Wallace Washington. Reading returned to his Rancho Buena Ventura in Shasta County in 1856, where he remained until his death in 1868.

References

1816 births
1868 deaths
California Whigs
19th-century American politicians
American city founders
American people of the Bear Flag Revolt
People from Shasta County, California